The Thai National Radio Telescope is a 40 m single-dish short-millimetre telescope located in Huai Hong Khrai Royal Development Study Centre at Doi Saket District in Chiang Mai Province, and operated by the National Astronomical Research Institute of Thailand (NARIT). The radio observatory operates in the frequency range of 300 MHz – 115 GHz. The contract for the construction of the telescope was awarded March 2017 to the Germany company MT Mechatronics, a subsidiary of OHB SE.

References

External links
  

Radio telescopes
Buildings and structures in Chiang Mai province
Astronomical observatories in Thailand